Antipater was an astrologer or mathematician of ancient Greece of uncertain date. He wrote a work upon genethlialogia, in which he endeavored to explain man's fate, not from the circumstances under which he was born, but from those under which he had been conceived. Nothing further is known of his life.

Notes

See also
 Archinapolus

Ancient Greek astrologers
Ancient Greek mathematicians